The Taman Naga Emas MRT station is a mass rapid transit (MRT) station in Salak Selatan district in southern Kuala Lumpur, Malaysia. It is one of the stations on the MRT Putrajaya Line.

The station is opened to public on 16 March 2023.

Location
The station is near the PLUS toll road and the Besraya toll road. It is also approximately 1.5 km west of  Bandar Tasik Selatan station.

References

External links
 Klang Valley Mass Rapid Transit website
 MRT Hawk-Eye View

Rapid transit stations in Kuala Lumpur
Sungai Buloh-Serdang-Putrajaya Line